Peter Andresen Oelrichs (26 February 1781, in Heligoland – 18 June 1869, in Amsterdam) was a captain. He was the author of Kleines Wörterbuch zur Erlernung der Helgolander Sprache für Deutsche, Engländer und Holländer, a vocabulary translating words spoken on the island of Heligoland into German, French and Dutch.

Notes

1781 births
1869 deaths
Translators to German
Translators to French
Translators to English
Linguists from Germany
German male non-fiction writers
19th-century German translators